The Command-Aire was an American aircraft manufacturer from the late 1920s and early 1930s based in Little Rock, Arkansas.

History
The company was founded on August 26, 1926 by Major J. Carroll Cone and W. F. Moody as the Arkansas Aircraft Corporation. Aircraft were built in the former Climber Motor Company Factory at 1823 East 17th Street in Little Rock, Arkansas. 
After a failed attempt by their first engineer to produce their own design, they attempted to arrange the purchase of a production licence for the Heinkel HD 40, and when that fell through they hired a Heinkel engineer, Albert Vollmecke, who would be responsible for the rest of the company's designs. 
In September 1928, the company was purchased by Robert B. Snowden and the name was changed to Command-Aire. With rapidly declining sales due to the Great Depression, and with no acceptable offers for a merger, the company declared bankruptcy in 1931 and its remaining assets were sold off.

Aircraft

References

Citations

Bibliography

Aerospace companies of the United States
Defunct aircraft manufacturers of the United States
Companies based in Little Rock, Arkansas
Manufacturing companies established in 1926
Manufacturing companies disestablished in 1931
1926 establishments in Arkansas
Defunct manufacturing companies based in Arkansas